Content engineering is a term applied to an engineering specialty dealing with the complexities around the use of content in computer-facilitated environments.

Content authoring and production, content management, content modeling, content conversion, and content use and repurposing are all areas involving this practice. It is not a specialty with wide industry recognition and is often performed on an ad hoc basis by members of software development or content production or marketing staff, but is beginning to be recognized as a necessary function in any complex content-centric project involving both content production as well as software system development mainly involving content management systems (CMS) or digital experience platforms (DXP).

Content engineering tends to bridge the gap between groups involved in the production of content (publishing and editorial staff, marketing, sales, human resources) and more technologically oriented departments such as software development, or IT that put this content to use in web or other software-based environments, and requires an understanding of the issues and processes of both sides.

Typically, content engineering involves extensive use of embedded XML technologies, XML being the most widespread language for representing structured content. Content management systems are a key technology often used in the practice of content engineering.

Definition 
Content engineering is the practice of organizing the shape and structure of content by deploying content and metadata models, in authoring and publishing processes in a manner that meets the requirements of an organization’s Content Strategy, and its implementation through the use of technology such as CMS, XML, schema markup, artificial intelligence, APIs and others.

Purpose and goal 
In very general terms, content engineering practices aim to maximize the ROI of content through content reuse and improving efficiency of content marketing, content operations, content strategy.

Content engineering can help address content challenges that fairly typical organizations face:

 Siloed content supply chains
 Duplicate content in a myriad of formats
 Inefficient content authoring workflows
 Chunky, unstructured content
 Outdated technology
 Technology in place does not match needs
 Inability to reuse content across channels (multi-channel content)
 Metadata and schema are not used
 Lack of standards for metadata
 Lack of findability of content for internal and external use
 Poor SEO performance
 Inability to implement personalization

The role of a content engineer 
Content engineers bridge the divide between content strategists and producers and the developers and content managers who publish and distribute content. But rather than simply wedging themselves between these players, content engineers help define and facilitate the content structure during the entire content strategy, production and distribution cycle from beginning to end.

With equal parts business and technology savvy, the content engineer does not see content as a static and finished piece. Rather, he or she looks at the value of the content and how it can best be adapted and personalized to serve customers and emerging content platforms, technologies, and opportunities.

Create customer experience 
Content marketing suffers from two fundamental limitations that constrain the true power and potential that a great content marketing plan can bring to a business' bottom line:

 Content relevance: how to make content more relevant and personalized to their audiences. The marketer and content strategist direct the customer experience itself, and the content engineer makes it happen with content structure, schema, metadata, microdata, taxonomy, and CMS topology.
 Content agility: Marketers who are burdened with one-size-fits-all content remain stuck managing their content rather than their customers' experience. Content engineers give marketers the "super powers" to move content-powered experiences across interfaces and personalization variants.

Break down barriers 
 Empower content strategists: Content engineers work with content strategists by helping them connect content not as a fixed message, but as a modular construct which can be channeled and manipulated.
 Enable content producers: A content engineer will work with a content producer by helping to find new sources of content and ways the content can be combined and presented.
 Guide and free developers: The content engineer helps translate marketing strategy into clear technical needs and functions developers can build into content management systems
 Enhance content management: Develop content structures that make it easier for content writers and content managers to author to a single, very usable, interface for even complex content types that might contain dozens of elements.
 Engineer content for success: Content engineers help all members of a marketing team work more smoothly, with the support and structures needed to get the most out of the content they produce.

References

Sources 
 "What is Content Engineering?". www.simplea.com 
 "Content Engineer Roles and Responsibilities". www.stc.org - Society of Technical Communication, 2020 
 "Is Your Content Plan Equipped for Content Engineering?". www.contentmarketinginstitute.com 
 "John Collins: Content Engineering – Episode 106". wwwellessmedia.com
 "I am a Content Engineer". www.everypageispageone.com

Data management